Bombus appositus is a species of bumblebee known commonly as the white-shouldered bumblebee. It is native to western North America, including western Canada and the western United States.

This species lives in open habitat, such as meadows and slopes. It nests underground or on the surface. Males congregate to seek mates. It feeds on a variety of plant taxa, including giant hyssops, thistles, gentians, owl's clovers, locoweeds, penstemons, and clovers. It especially favors subalpine larkspur (Delphinium barbeyi) and it serves as one of the plant's main pollinators.

This species is a host to Bombus insularis, a species of cuckoo bumblebee.

References

Bumblebees
Hymenoptera of North America
Insects described in 1878